Shirley Hill Witt (born April 17, 1934) is an anthropologist, author, civil rights activist, and former foreign service officer. A member of the Akwesasne Mohawk Nation, Wolf Clan, Witt was one of the first Native American women to earn a Ph.D. She obtained her Ph.D. in evolutionary anthropology from the University of New Mexico in 1969. Witt has published extensively on Native Americans in addition to being a poet and fiction writer. She was a founding member of the National Indian Youth Council.

Education 
Witt received her B.A. from the University of Michigan in 1965 and her M.A. from the University of Michigan in 1966. She later obtained her Ph.D. in evolutionary anthropology from the University of New Mexico in 1969 with her dissertation "Migration into the San Juan Indian Pueblo, 1726-1968".

Career 
Witt has taught at the University of North Carolina at Chapel Hill (1970–1972) and Colorado College (1972–1974). She was the director of the Rocky Mountain Regional Office of the U.S. Commission on Civil Rights (1975–1983). Witt also served as the Cabinet Secretary for Natural Resources under New Mexico Governor Toney Anaya (1983–1985). In 1985, she joined the U.S. diplomatic corps. In 2000, Witt was one of the plaintiffs in a sex-discrimination case against the United States Information Agency. The 1,100 women accused the agency of "manipulating the hiring process to exclude women, in some cases resorting to fraud, altering test scores and destroying personnel and test files." Although the agency did not admit to any wrongdoing, each woman was awarded at least $460,000.

Activism 
Inspired by the civil rights movement, young American Indians started radical indigenous activism that centered on sovereignty, decolonization, and anti-imperialism. At the 1961 American Indian Chicago Conference, a youth caucus was formed by student activists. That group eventually formed the National Indian Youth Council in 1961 and Witt became the founding vice president. The organization published a monthly newsletter, ABC: Americans Before Columbus.

Published works 
 Witt, Shirley Hill and Steiner, Stan, The Way: An Anthology of American Indian Literature, Vintage Books, 1972, 
 Witt, Shirley Hill, The Tuscaroras, Crowell-Collier Press, 1972, 
 Witt, Shirley Hill and Ballejos, Gilberto Chávez, El Indio Jesús: A Novel, University of Oklahoma Press, 2000,   
 Witt, Shirley Hill and Ballejos, Gilberto Chávez, Tomóchic Blood, AuthorHouse, 2006, 
 Shreve, Bradley G., Red Power Rising: The National Indian Youth Council and the Origins of Native Activism (foreword), University of Oklahoma Press, 2012,

References 

University of Michigan alumni
University of New Mexico alumni
University of North Carolina at Chapel Hill faculty
Colorado College faculty
American women poets
Native American women writers
American civil rights activists
American Mohawk people
1934 births
Living people
American women academics
21st-century American women